A list of American films released in 2000. Gladiator won the Academy Award for Best Picture, the BAFTA Award for Best Film, and the Golden Globe Award for Best Motion Picture – Drama. Almost Famous won the Golden Globe Award for Best Motion Picture – Musical or Comedy. Traffic won the Satellite Award for Best Film – Drama. Nurse Betty won the Satellite Award for Best Film – Musical or Comedy.

Into the Arms of Strangers: Stories of the Kindertransport won the Academy Award for Best Documentary. Reckless Indifference won the Satellite Award for Best Documentary Film.

You Can Count on Me and Girlfight won the Grand Jury Prize: Dramatic. Long Night's Journey into Day won the Grand Jury Prize: Documentary. Magnolia won the Golden Bear.

Battlefield Earth won the Golden Raspberry Award for Worst Picture.

See also
 2000 in American television
 2000 in the United States

External links

 
 List of 2000 box office number-one films in the United States

Films
Lists of 2000 films by country or language
2000